Høland is a former municipality in Akershus county, Norway.

History
Høland was created in 1837 as a formannskapsdistrikt, a Norwegian local self-government district. The district Setskog was separated from Høland to form a separate municipality January 1, 1905. The split left Høland with 4,928 inhabitants. Høland municipality existed until 1 July 1924, when it was split to form the two new municipalities of Nordre Høland and Søndre Høland. Before the partition Høland had a population of 5,294. On 1 January 1966,  Nordre Høland and Søndre Høland, were merged with Setskog and Aurskog to form the new municipality of Aurskog-Høland.

Origins of the Name
The name Høland is an old, historic district name. The first element is høy meaning hay. The last element is land meaning land (originally in plural).

People From Høland
Hjalmar Holand, Norwegian-American historian and author.

References

Former municipalities of Norway
Aurskog-Høland